Brigadier Christopher John Beckett, 4th Baron Grimthorpe OBE, DL (16 September 1915 – 6 July 2003), was a soldier, company director, landowner and peer of the realm.

Personal life
Christopher John Beckett was born 16 September 1915, eldest son of Ralph Beckett, 3rd Baron Grimthorpe, TD, (1891–1963), a partner in the banking firm of Beckett and Co., of Leeds, Yorkshire, by his first wife, Mary Alice, daughter of Colonel Mervyn Archdale, 12th Lancers, and Mary Kate de Bathe, daughter of Sir Henry de Bathe, 4th Baronet. He grew up at Easthorpe Hall, Malton, in North Yorkshire, where his father and his second wife, Angela, ran a stud where they bred Fragrant Mac, which won the Scottish Grand National in 1952. The best horse they owned, however, was Fortina, winner of the 1947 Cheltenham Gold Cup.

Christopher Beckett was educated at Eton. He succeeded his father as fourth Baron and eighth Baronet in 1963.

On 17 February 1954, he married Lady Elizabeth Lumley, daughter of Roger Lumley, 11th Earl of Scarbrough, of Lumley Castle, Lord Chamberlain to the Queen. The wedding took place at the Queen's Chapel, Marlborough Gate, sometimes called the Marlborough House Chapel, by special permission of the sovereign, and the wedding reception took place at St James's Palace. Queen Elizabeth The Queen Mother, Princess Margaret, and the Duchess of Gloucester attended. In 1973 Lady Grimthorpe joined the household of the Queen Mother as a Lady of the Bedchamber, and remained in that post at Clarence House until the death of Her Majesty.

Lord Grimthorpe was a director of Thirsk Race Committee, and was a member of the Jockey Club. He also served as a consultant and sales representative with Sir Alfred McAlpine and Son Ltd. In 1973 he joined the board of Yorkshire Post Newspapers, of which his uncle, the Hon Rupert Beckett, had been chairman for 30 years, 1920–1950. Lord Grimthorpe was appointed OBE (military) in 1958.

A memorial service was held at York Minster on 16 July 2003. He is survived by Lady Grimthorpe, two sons, Edward John and Ralph Daniel (Danny) Beckett, and a daughter, Harriet.

Military career
Lord Grimthorpe had a distinguished military career, retiring from the Army in 1968 as a Brigadier.

He was Colonel Commanding the 9th Queen's Royal Lancers from 1955 to 1958 and Brigadier Royal Armoured Corps Western Command from 1961 to 1964. He was deputy commander of HQ Malta and Libya from 1964 to 1967 and served as an ADC to the Queen.

In retirement he was a Deputy Lieutenant for North Yorkshire from 1969 and Colonel of the 9th/12th Lancers from 1973 to 1978.

Arms

References

External links 
Obituary

Barons in the Peerage of the United Kingdom
1915 births
2003 deaths
People educated at Eton College
Officers of the Order of the British Empire
9th Queen's Royal Lancers officers
9th/12th Royal Lancers officers
Deputy Lieutenants of the North Riding of Yorkshire
British Army personnel of World War II
Royal Armoured Corps officers
Christopher
British Army brigadiers
Grimthorpe